The Rawlings Gold Glove Award, usually referred to as the Gold Glove, is the award given annually to the Major League Baseball players judged to have exhibited superior individual fielding performances at each fielding position in both the National League (NL) and the American League (AL), as voted by the managers and coaches in each league. Managers are not permitted to vote for their own players. Eighteen Gold Gloves are awarded each year (with the exception of 1957, 1985, 2007 and 2018), one at each of the nine positions in each league. In 1957, the baseball glove manufacturer Rawlings created the Gold Glove Award to commemorate the best fielding performance at each position. The award was created from a glove made from gold lamé-tanned leather and affixed to a walnut base. Initially, only one Gold Glove per position was awarded to the top fielder at each position in the entire major league; however, separate awards were given for the National and American Leagues beginning in 1958.

The phrase "at each position" was not strictly accurate until 2011, when the awards were changed to specify individual awards for left fielder, center fielder, and right fielder. Previously, the prize was presented to three outfielders irrespective of their specific position. Any combination of outfielders, often three center fielders, could win the award in the same year. Critics called for awarding a single Gold Glove for each individual outfield position, arguing that the three outfield positions are not equivalent defensively. In the 1985 American League voting, a tie for third-place resulted in the presentation of Gold Glove Awards to four outfielders (Dwayne Murphy, Gary Pettis, Dwight Evans and Dave Winfield); this scenario was repeated in the National League in 2007 (Andruw Jones, Carlos Beltrán, Aaron Rowand, and Jeff Francoeur). Father and son Bobby and Barry Bonds are the only family pair who have won Gold Glove Awards as outfielders.

Roberto Clemente and Willie Mays are tied for the most Gold Gloves won among outfielders; Clemente won 12 consecutive National League awards with the Pittsburgh Pirates, as did Mays with the New York and San Francisco Giants. Four outfielders are tied for the second-highest total with 10 wins: Andruw Jones, Ken Griffey Jr., Al Kaline, and Ichiro Suzuki. There is one 9-time winner, Torii Hunter, who won his awards consecutively. There have been six 8-time winners (Barry Bonds, Evans, Paul Blair, Andre Dawson, Jim Edmonds, and Garry Maddox), and six 7-time awardees (Winfield, Curt Flood, Alex Gordon, Larry Walker, Devon White and Carl Yastrzemski). Murphy and Kirby Puckett each won six American League awards; there have been eight 5-time winners and nine 4-time winners as well. Darin Erstad won a Gold Glove as a first baseman in 2004 after winning two awards in the outfield (2000, 2002), making him the only player to win the award as an infielder and an outfielder.

Fifteen outfielders have posted errorless Gold Glove-winning seasons: twelve in the American League and three in the National League. The only players to accomplish the feat twice were Mickey Stanley, who posted a 1.000 fielding percentage in 1968 and 1970, and Nick Markakis, who posted a 1.000 FPct in 2011 and 2014. Other outfielders who have played complete seasons without an error include Flood (1966), Clemente (1972), Yastrzemski (1977), Hunter (2008), Ken Berry (1972), Bernie Williams (2000), Vernon Wells (2005), Franklin Gutiérrez (2010), Jacoby Ellsbury (2011), Andre Ethier (2011), and Joe Rudi, who played only 44 games in the outfield in 1975 while appearing in 91 games at first base. Murphy leads all outfield winners with 507 putouts in 1980, and Jones leads National Leaguers with 493 (1999). Clemente leads all winners in assists; he had 27 in 1961, and American League leaders Kaline and Gordon had 23 in 1958 and 2011 respectively. Jesse Barfield doubled off eight runners in consecutive seasons (1986 and 1987) for the Toronto Blue Jays, while Dave Parker leads all winners with nine double plays in 1977 for the Pirates.

Key

American League winners

National League winners

Footnotes

References
General

Inline citations

External links
Rawlings Gold Glove Award Website

Gold Glove Award